Solé is a French and Spanish surname.

 Bernat Solé (born 1975), Catalan politician
  (born 1948) known as Solé, French comics artist
 Jordi Solé Tura (1930–2009), Spanish politician
 Pedro Solé (1905–1982), Spanish footballer
 Robert Solé (born 1946), French writer and journalist

See also
 Solé (born 1973), American rapper

French-language surnames
Catalan-language surnames